Trehan is a hamlet near Saltash in Cornwall, England, United Kingdom.

References

Hamlets in Cornwall